James Vincent Orlando (February 27, 1916 – October 24, 1992) was a Canadian ice hockey player who played 199 games in the National Hockey League with the Detroit Red Wings between 1937 and 1943.

Playing career
Jimmy Orlando was an enforcer throughout his NHL career. He averaged over 80 PIM's per season, twice posting 99 penalty minutes in a single season in 1941 and again in 1943. He posted 111 Penalty minutes in 1942. He helped the Detroit Red Wings win the Stanley Cup in 1937 and in  1943. After missing 2 years of hockey while fighting in World War II he returned to Canada and played in the Quebec Senior Hockey League from 1945–1951. He retired from hockey after the 1951 season.

When Jimmy, then known as "the bad man on ice," was arrested by the FBI in 1944, for claiming to be in an essential war effort job and after being bailed out by the Wings president, he promptly jumped bail, returning to Canada.  He then joined the Canadian Army but was thereafter a wanted man in the US, effectively ending his NHL career.  Several legal appeals failed to change anything for Jimmy, so he became the manager of the El Morocco nightclub in Montreal, working for owner Eddie Quinn, the wrestling czar.

An iconic photo exists of a blood-soaked Orlando playing through a head wound.

Orlando was also described by legendary Montreal sports writer Mike Farber story as being the spectator who rushed to the aid of NHL hockey commissioner Clarence Campbell when attacked at the Montreal Forum at the start of the Rocket Richard Riot. Orlando was described as having knocked the assailant's teeth out "like Chicklets."

It was at the El Morocco that Jimmy met Lili St. Cyr, then on her way to becoming the most famous burlesque dancer of all time. Quinn was Lili's sugar-daddy but had Jimmy act as a beard when Mrs. Quinn was around.  One of the great romances of the century soon followed lasting for many years, in amongst Lili's six marriages and Jimmy's dalliances. Jimmy played with several of the Quebec Senior Hockey League teams up until 1951.

Orlando went on to own several of his own night spots which were favorite hangouts for Montreal's many jazz musicians & gangsters. Jimmy also refereed big-time wrestling matches at the Montreal Forum and remained a much beloved celebrity until his death.

Career statistics

Regular season and playoffs

Awards and achievements
1948, 1949 QSHL First All-Star Team
1937 and 1943 Stanley Cup Championship  (Detroit)
1939 IAHL Second All-Star Team

External links

1916 births
1992 deaths
Canadian ice hockey defencemen
Canadian military personnel of World War II
Detroit Red Wings players
Ice hockey people from Montreal
Montreal Royals (QSHL) players
Ottawa Senators (QSHL) players
Pittsburgh Hornets players
Springfield Indians players
Stanley Cup champions
Valleyfield Braves players